Miss Israel is a national beauty pageant in Israel. The pageant was founded in 1950, where the winners were sent to Miss Universe. The pageant was also existing to send delegates to Miss World, Miss International, Miss Europe and Miss Asia Pacific International. The 1970 competition was held in International Convention Center, Jerusalem. Moshit Tsiporin was the winner.

Results

References

External links
http://jpress.org.il/Olive/APA/NLI_heb/SharedView.Article.aspx?href=MAR%2F1970%2F04%2F08&id=Ar00422&sk=80F80DC6
http://www.ynet.co.il/articles/0,7340,L-490328,00.html

1970 beauty pageants
1970 in Israel
Miss Israel
1970s in Jerusalem